Steven John Reid (born 10 March 1981) is a former professional footballer who played as a right back, having previously played most of his career in midfield. He was most recently the first team coach at Nottingham Forest.

Reid began his career with Millwall in 1998, moving to Blackburn Rovers five years later. After an initial loan spell, he joined West Bromwich Albion in 2010. His career was troubled by injury; he once notably played for 45 minutes  against Arsenal at the Emirates Stadium with a broken leg. Reid retired in 2015 after a season with Burnley.

Born in England, he was capped 23 times at international level for the Republic of Ireland and scored two goals for them from 2001 to 2008. He was part of their squad at the 2002 FIFA World Cup.

Club career

Millwall
Born in Kingston upon Thames, London, Reid attended St. Agatha's Catholic Primary School and Richard Challoner School in the same outer London area. He started his career at Millwall, and made his professional debut in the 1997–98 season at the age of 17. He was part of the successful 2000–01 team that gained promotion to the English First Division. Reid gained a reputation for his strong, driving runs and phenomenal long range shooting ability, memorably scoring from 35 yards against Norwich City on the opening day of the 2001–02 season to set Millwall on their way to a 4–0 victory. Reid earned his first cap for Ireland while at the Den. He continued to impress for both club and country, triggering a £1.85 million move to Blackburn Rovers in July 2003.

Blackburn Rovers

Reid debuted for Blackburn Rovers on 23 August 2003 as a 76th-minute substitute for Vratislav Greško, but had the misfortune of being dismissed in the 88th minute. He went on to make 19 appearances through the 2003–04 season, though a hamstring injury would rule him out of action for three months during this time. A change of management in September 2004 saw Mark Hughes replace Graeme Souness as Blackburn boss, a move which would also signify a change for Reid. Despite playing the majority of his career as a wide midfielder, Hughes moved Reid to centre midfield for the match against Everton on 6 March 2005. Reid went on to star in a 1–0 victory for Blackburn, creating the winning goal, and has since claimed the central midfield position.

Reid scored one of the goals of the seasons in the 2005–06 Premier League campaign against Wigan at the JJB Stadium. The ball fell to Reid from 30 yards and he scored a volley into the top corner of the net. The goal won BBC Match of the Day's Goal of the Month for December. On 2 May 2006, Reid scored the goal that secured Blackburn's place in the 2006–07 UEFA Cup, a header that gave them a 1–0 win over Chelsea.

Reid missed the majority of the 2006–07 season through injury. A back injury limited him to three appearances before he sustained cruciate ligament injury in January, which kept him out for the rest of the season.

It appeared that Reid's injury problems were behind him after a full pre-season and solid start to Blackburn's 2008–09 season, however his injury woes would return, with another knee injury ruling him out of the entire 2008–09 season.

On 19 November 2009, Reid signed on loan for Queens Park Rangers (QPR) in an attempt to recapture his career from injury. The loan lasted until midway through December 2009. During which time Reid wore the number 36 shirt. He, along with other players, appeared in a Libertines video (fronted by QPR fan Pete Doherty) celebrating the bands re-union.

West Bromwich Albion
On 5 March 2010, West Bromwich Albion signed Reid on a one-month loan.
He made his debut against his previous loan club, Queens Park Rangers, on 6 March 2010, playing at right back in the 3–1 defeat at Loftus Road. He scored his first goal for the club against Coventry City on 24 March 2010. On 26 May 2010, Reid joined West Brom following their promotion to the Premier League on a permanent basis after signing a two-year contract. He officially joined on 1 July 2010 after a medical and had the option of a further 12-month extension on his contract. He scored his first goal for the club after making his move permanent against Leicester City in the League Cup on 26 October 2010.

At the opening season of 2011/12, Reid scored an own goal in a 2–1 loss against Manchester United after Ashley Young cross from the left took a deflection off Reid and beat goalkeeper Ben Foster As the season progressed, Reid asserted himself as the number one right back and continued into the 2011–12 season, scoring his first goal of the season from a free-kick against Wigan in December 2011. After a match against Chelsea which West Brom won 1–0 on 3 March 2012, Reid missed the rest of the season after injuring ankle ligaments in a match. While recovering ankle ligaments from his injury, Reid signed a new two-year deal that would keep him at West Brom  until 2014.

Burnley

After being released by West Bromwich Albion at the end of the 2013–14 season Reid was initially considering taking up a coaching role at the Hawthorns. However, after being approached by newly promoted Burnley, managed by his former Millwall teammate Sean Dyche he opted to stay on playing and signed a one-year contract at Turf Moor.

On 18 May 2015, with Burnley relegated, Reid announced that he would retire at the end of the season, and enter coaching.

International career
Despite representing England at junior levels, Reid decided to play full international football for the Republic of Ireland, whom he qualifies to play for through his grandfather who was born in County Galway. He was part of the Irish squad at the 2002 FIFA World Cup after being called up as a late replacement.

Reid was made the captain of the Republic of Ireland football team for their 16 August 2006 friendly match against the Netherlands.

Reid retired from international football on 13 July 2010 in order to concentrate on his club career. He later raised the possibility of a comeback if Ireland were stuck in the midfield department.

Coaching career
On 25 June 2015, Reid was appointed in the role of first-team coach at Championship club Reading. Reid vacated his position on 27 July 2017, in a bid to pursue new challenges.

That September, he joined Crystal Palace, in the same position that he held at Reading. Reid left the club the following August, with manager Roy Hodgson indicating that Reid had cited personal issues and wished to take time away from football. He then briefly coached at AFC Wimbledon, leaving in December 2018.

On 18 April 2019, he was appointed to assist caretaker manager Jimmy Shan at West Bromwich Albion. He worked for West Brom until the end of the 2018–19 season, before joining Steve Clarke's backroom staff at the Scottish national team in May 2019. Reid left the position with Scotland in August 2021, after becoming a first team coach with Nottingham Forest. On 16 September 2021, Reid was appointed Interim Manager of Nottingham Forest, following the dismissal of Chris Hughton.

In October 2022, Reid revealed that he had left his job as Nottingham Forest assistant manager in order to begin studying to qualify as a counsellor.

Career statistics

Club

International

Managerial

Honours
Millwall
Football League Second Division: 2000–01
Football League Trophy runner-up: 1998–99

West Bromwich Albion
Football League Championship runner-up: 2009–10

See also
 List of Republic of Ireland international footballers born outside the Republic of Ireland

References

External links

1981 births
Living people
Footballers from Kingston upon Thames
English footballers
England youth international footballers
Republic of Ireland association footballers
Republic of Ireland international footballers
Association football midfielders
Millwall F.C. players
Blackburn Rovers F.C. players
Queens Park Rangers F.C. players
West Bromwich Albion F.C. players
Premier League players
English Football League players
2002 FIFA World Cup players
English people of Irish descent
Black British sportsmen
Burnley F.C. players
Reading F.C. non-playing staff
Crystal Palace F.C. non-playing staff
Republic of Ireland expatriate association footballers
Nottingham Forest F.C. non-playing staff
Nottingham Forest F.C. managers